Lieutenant Colonel Sir George Charles Thomas Steward  (18 March 1865 – 11 May 1920) was a senior Australian public servant and officer in the Australian Army. He held several notable positions during his career, including Official Secretary to five Governors-General, being the first to hold that title, and Chief Commissioner of the Victoria Police from 1919 until his death in 1920. During his time as Official Secretary, Steward founded the Australian branch of the Imperial Counter Espionage Bureau, later known as the Special Intelligence Bureau (SIB). This was Australia's first secret intelligence service.

Career 
Steward was a member of the civil service of the colony of Tasmania, in which he advanced rapidly. He was an officer in the Tasmanian Auxiliary Forces, and later the Australian Citizen Military Forces. He raised the first Mounted Infantry Corps of Tasmania.

At Federation in 1901, there was a push from the newly formed states to have representatives from their former colonial civil services to take senior positions in the new Commonwealth Public Service. Steward was originally expected to become the Secretary of the Department of External Affairs. However, Sir Edmund Barton, Prime Minister and holding the portfolio of Minister for External Affairs, decided instead to appoint Atlee Hunt as the senior official in the Department. Steward instead served as Chief Clerk.

In December 1902, Steward was appointed as the Official Secretary to the Governor General, Lord Tennyson. He was the first person to serve in this position which he held for seventeen years, under five Governors General. When war broke out in 1914, Steward's civilian employment took precedence, and he was not released for military service despite his military experience. In 1916, as part of his role in the Governor General’s office, Steward founded the Australian branch of the Imperial Counter Espionage Bureau, later known as the Special Intelligence Bureau (SIB). This was Australia’s first secret intelligence service.

Steward was appointed as Chief Commissioner of the Victoria Police in 1919, which attracted some controversy because he was not a police officer himself. He served as Chief Commissioner until his death on 11 May 1920, after suffering a heart attack while driving. He is buried in the St Kilda Cemetery.

Honours and awards
Steward was made Companion of the Order of St Michael and St George on the same day as Major General Sir William Throsby Bridges KCB CMG in 1909.

References 

1865 births
1920 deaths
Australian public servants
Australian Knights Commander of the Order of the British Empire
Australian Companions of the Order of St Michael and St George